Frying Pan Lake (renamed Waimangu Cauldron in 1963 though not widely used) is the world's largest hot spring.

Echo Crater was formed as part of the 1886 Mount Tarawera eruption, which opened several craters along a  rift stretching southwest from Mount Tarawera to the nearby Southern Crater.  After this event, the crater's floor partly filled with rainwater and heated groundwater, but it was not until after a large eruption in Echo Crater on 1 April 1917 that the resulting larger crater filled up from hot springs to reach its current size by mid 1918.

The most recent eruption in Echo Crater occurred on 22 February 1973, destroying the Trinity Terrace area on the south-eastern shore of Frying Pan Lake.  An area of colourful sinter terraces is still visible on the western shore of the lake.  To the north, the lake is bounded by the steaming Cathedral Rocks.  This monolithic rock structure is composed of rhyolitic lava at least 60,000 years old and was named Gibraltar Rock until the 1917 Echo Crater eruption completely changed its shape.  A fumarole known as the Devil's Blowhole in the northern wall of Echo Crater also disappeared in that event.

The lake and its outflow, Waimangu Stream (referred to as Hot Water Creek in the Waimangu Wanderer Guide), have an average pH level of 3.8, even though some of the boiling hot springs and vents on the lake's bed feed it with alkaline water of pH 8.2 to 8.7. This leads to various gradients of pH levels, which govern which types of algae are present, the blue-green algae Mastigocladus laminosus, or the eukaryotic algae Cyanidium caldarium.

The unique cyclic nature of the hydrothermal system interconnecting Frying Pan Lake and the nearby Inferno Crater Lake has been the subject of studies since monitoring equipment was installed in 1970 at the outflow stream from Frying Pan Lake and at Inferno Crater Lake. Both lakes' water levels and overflow volumes follow a complicated rhythm that repeats itself roughly every 38 days. When the water level and temperature of Inferno Crater Lake increase, the water level and outflow of Frying Pan Lake decrease.

Frying Pan Lake is one of the first major attractions encountered along the wheelchair-friendly main Waimangu walking track. The site of the extinct Waimangu Geyser is located not far from its north-eastern shore.

See also

Boiling Lake
Grand Prismatic Spring
List of hot springs

References

Rotorua Lakes District
Landforms of the Bay of Plenty Region
Okataina Volcanic Centre
Hot springs of New Zealand